Virginia Maria Machado is a Colombian model and actress. She has acted in TV series and appeared in music videos.

Career 
In her interview to Colombian newspaper El Espectador, she said her first catwalk was at the age of 13. She started her acting career with Dora, and her character "Brigit" in Lady, la vendedora de rosas was important in her acting career after modelling. She had acted in La Cacica and Comando élite. Her performance in TV series La esclava blanca was described as flawless by Publimetro, the Colombian edition of Metro International.

Personal life 
El Universal reported that she had lived in Mexico and Italy during her modeling career.

Filmography

References

External links 
 

Colombian actresses
Colombian female models
Living people
1979 births